Bo Göran Rickard Broman (born 1969) is a Swedish business entrepreneur and politician who is a member of the Riksdag for the Sweden Democrats party.

Biography 
Broman was born in Eslöv. He studied law, computer technology and economics at Lunds University and worked in the business sector. He also managed a variety of ventures, including corporate management of the Medborgarhuset and Trollenäs Castle. For a period, he also owned and operated the Stensson Hotel in Eslöv.

He was the Sweden Democrats' finance chief and during the 2018 Swedish general election was elected Riksdag, the Swedish parliament for the Stockholm County. Broman has cited support for tougher policies on crime, security and opposition to the European Union as his reasons for standing for the SD. In parliament, Broman sits on the EU Committee and is a member of the council for the Sveriges riksbank.

Personal life 
Broman is openly gay, making him the first openly LGBT parliamentary candidate to be elected to the Riksdag for the Sweden Democrats.

References 

Members of the Riksdag from the Sweden Democrats
Living people
Members of the Riksdag 2018–2022
Gay politicians
Swedish LGBT politicians
LGBT legislators
LGBT conservatism
1969 births
People from Eslöv Municipality
Lund University alumni
Swedish businesspeople
21st-century Swedish LGBT people
Members of the Riksdag 2022–2026